The NZRL Men's National Competition (previously called the National Zonal Competition) is the top-level rugby league competition run by the New Zealand Rugby League. In 2010 the competition replaced the Bartercard Premiership following a Sparc funded review and restructure of the New Zealand Rugby League. Since 2019, the competition has consisted of a four-team national premiership and an eight-team national championship (split into North and South Island Conferences) with a promotion and relegation between the two divisions.

Trophies and awards
Senior teams compete for the Albert Baskerville Trophy, which is named after Albert Baskerville, the organiser of the 1907-1908 All Golds tour. Under-17s compete for the Mark Graham Cup, which is named after Mark Graham, the New Zealand Rugby League player of the century. Under-15s compete for the Nathan Cayless Cup, which is named after Nathan Cayless, the only captain to win the World Cup for New Zealand.

Structure
The competition was reformatted for the 2016 season, with Akarana, Counties Manukau, Canterbury and Wellington competing in a national championship. The Upper Central and Mid-Central zones reverted to district teams with these teams, alongside Northland and the South Island districts, competing in four regional championships. The four regional winners then compete in a National Premiership competition, which play a promotion-relegation match against the last placed national championship side.

From 2019, this changed again, with a 4-team Premiership and 8-team, two conference (North and South Island) Championship contested.

NZRL Premiership Teams

NZRL Championship Teams

Season winners

Note: *In 2014 Counties Manukau were disqualified from the final for fielding an ineligible player.

See also

NZRL National Youth Tournament
NZRL National Secondary Schools Tournament
NZRL Women's National Competition

References

External links
 
 

Rugby league competitions in New Zealand
2010 establishments in New Zealand
Sports leagues established in 2010